Jüri Raidla (born 2 July 1957 in Estonia) is an Estonian lawyer, founder and senior partner of Ellex Raidla (one of the largest law firms in Estonia).

Career 
1980 was educated at the University of Tartu (law degree cum laude), 1987 at University of St. Petersburg (Russia), Ph.D and 1992 at post-doctorate program at Lund University (Sweden).

1981–1988 Legal counsel of various agricultural companies, 1989 Chairman of the District Council in Pärnu. From 3 April 1990 to 30 January 1992 he was the Estonian Minister of Justice. 1992–1993 Managing Director of Estonian Banking Association. He is the founder and senior partner of Ellex Raidla (one of the largest law firms in Estonia, established in 1993). Law Practice – General Commercial & Contract, Constitutional Law & Government Relations, Property Law, Construction & Real Estate Development.

Jüri Raidla has published a substantial number of articles, overviews and reports on various topics of Estonian law.
Jüri Raidla has spoken on a substantial number of domestic and international conferences on issues related to Estonian constitution, regaining Estonian independence, property reform, corporate governance

Raidla speaks Estonian, English and Russian language.

Participation in legislative drafting 
 Constitution of the Republic of Estonia
 Estonian State Symbols Act
 Law on Property Reform Act
 Law on Land Reform
 Law on Protection of Foreign Investments
 Privatization Law Act
 Development Fund Act
 Human Gene Research Act
 Health Insurance Act
 Unemployment Insurance Act
 Estonian Health Insurance Fund Act
 Credit Institutions Act

Memberships 
 Member of the International Bar Association
 Chairman of the Advisory Board of the University of Tartu
 Member of the Estonian Bar Association
 Member of Supervisory Board SA Iuridicum

Publications 
 Jüri Raidla, Rein Lang. "Estonia: Europe's Delaware?" – The European Lawyer, Issue 71/ September 2007
 "The Baltic Legal Infrastructure – Fit for Business." – Defensor Legis, 2004;
 "The War of Laws." – European Lawyer, 2003;
 Jüri Raidla, Ants Nõmper. "The Estonian Genome Project and the Human Gene Research Act." – Baltic Yearbook of International Law, 2002, Vol 2, pages 51–69;
 "Obligations Arising from Causing Damages by Motor Vehicles." – Olion, 1990.

References 

1957 births
Living people
University of Tartu alumni
Politicians from Tallinn
Justice ministers of Estonia
20th-century Estonian lawyers
Recipients of the Order of the National Coat of Arms, 2nd Class
Recipients of the Order of the White Star, 2nd Class
People from Lääneranna Parish
21st-century Estonian lawyers